This is a list of schools in Somerset, England. It covers those schools within the area of Somerset County Council, which includes the five non-metropolitan districts of  South Somerset, Taunton Deane, West Somerset, Sedgemoor and Mendip.

State funded schools

Primary and first schools
There are 242 state primary schools in Somerset.

Abbas and Templecombe CE Primary School, Templecombe
All Saints CE Infants School, Dulverton
All Saints Church School, Montacute
Ash CE Primary School,  Ash
Ashcott Primary School, Ashcott
Ashill Community Primary School, Ashill
Ashlands CE First School, Crewkerne
Avanti Park School, Frome
Avishayes Community Primary School, Chard
Axbridge CE First School Academy, Axbridge
Baltonsborough CE Primary School, Baltonsborough
Barwick and Stoford Community Primary School, Barwick
Beckington CE First School, Beckington
Beech Grove Primary School, Wellington
Berkley CE First School, Berkley
Berrow CE Primary School, Berrow
Birchfield Community Primary School, Yeovil
Bishop Henderson CE Primary School, Coleford
Bishop Henderson CE Primary School, Taunton
Bishops Hull Primary School, Bishops Hull
Bishops Lydeard Church School, Bishops Lydeard
Blackbrook Primary School, Taunton
Bowlish Infant School, Bowlish
Brent Knoll CE Primary School, Brent Knoll
Bridgwater College Academy, Bridgwater
Brookside Community Primary School, Street
Bruton Primary School, Bruton
Buckland St Mary CE School, Buckland St Mary
Burnham-on-Sea Community Infant School, Burnham-on-Sea
Butleigh CE Primary School, Butleigh
Cannington CE Primary School, Cannington
Castle Cary Community Primary School, Castle Cary
Castle Primary School, Stoke-sub-Hamdon
Catcott Primary School, Catcott
Charlton Horethorne CE Primary School, Charlton Horethorne
Charlton Mackrell CE Primary School, Charlton Mackrell
Cheddar First School, Cheddar
Cheddon Fitzpaine Church School, Cheddon Fitzpaine
Chewton Mendip CE Primary School, Chewton Mendip
Chilthorne Domer Church School, Chilthorne Domer
Christ Church CE First School, Frome
Churchfield Church School, Highbridge
Churchstanton Primary School, Churchstanton
Combe St Nicholas CE Primary School, Combe St Nicholas
Cotford St Luke Primary School, Cotford St Luke
Countess Gytha Primary School, Queen Camel
Coxley Primary School, Wells
Creech St Michael CE Primary School, Creech St Michael
Croscombe CE Primary School, Croscombe
Crowcombe CE Primary School, Crowcombe
Curry Mallet CE Primary School, Curry Mallet
Curry Rivel CE Primary School, Curry Rivel
Cutcombe CE First School, Wheddon Cross
Ditcheat Primary School, Ditcheat
Draycott & Rodney Stoke CE First School, Draycott
Dulverton Junior School, Dulverton
Dunster First School, Dunster
East Brent CE Academy, East Brent
East Coker Community Primary School, East Coker
East Huntspill Primary Academy, East Huntspill
Eastover Primary School, Bridgwater
Elmhurst Junior School, Street
Enmore CE Primary School, Enmore
Evercreech CE Primary School, Evercreech
Exford CE First School, Exford
Hambridge Community Primary School, Hambridge
Hamp Academy, Bridgwater
Hamp Infants' School, Bridgwater
Haselbury Plucknett CE First School, Haselbury Plucknett
Hatch Beauchamp CE Primary School, Hatch Beauchamp
Hayesdown First School, Frome
Hemington Primary School, Hemington
Herne View CE Primary School, Ilminster
High Ham CE Primary School, High Ham
Hindhayes Infant School, Street
Hinton St George CE Primary School, Hinton St George
Holway Park Community Primary School, Taunton
Holy Trinity CE Primary School, Taunton
Holy Trinity Church School, Yeovil
Horrington Primary School, West Horrington
Horsington Church School, Horsington
Huish Episcopi Primary School, Huish Episcopi
Huish Primary School, Yeovil
Ilchester Community School, Ilchester
Isambard Kingdom Brunel Primary School, Wellington
Keinton Mandeville Primary School, Keinton Mandeville
Kilmersdon CE Primary School, Kilmersdon
King Ina CE Academy, Somerton
Kingfisher Primary School, Houndstone
Kingsbury Episcopi Primary School, Kingsbury Episcopi
Kingsmoor Primary School, Bawdrip
Kingston St Mary CE Primary School, Kingston St Mary
Knights Templar Community Church School, Watchet
Langford Budville CE Primary School, Langford Budville
Leigh-on-Mendip School, Leigh-on-Mendip
Long Sutton CE Primary School, Long Sutton
Lovington CE Primary School, Lovington
Lydeard St Lawrence Community Primary School, Lydeard St Lawrence
Lympsham CE Academy, Lympsham
Lyngford Park Primary School, Taunton
Manor Court Community Primary School, Chard
Mark First & Pre School CE Academy, Mark
Martock CE Primary School, Martock
Meare Village Primary School, Meare
Mells CE First School, Mells
Merriott First School, Merriott
Middlezoy Primary School, Middlezoy
Milborne Port Primary School, Milborne Port
Milford Infants' School, Yeovil
Milford Junior School, Yeovil
Milverton Community Primary School, Milverton
Minehead First School, Minehead
Minerva Primary School, Taunton
Neroche Primary School, Ilminster
Nerrols Primary School, Taunton
Nether Stowey CE Primary School, Nether Stowey
North Cadbury CE Primary School, North Cadbury
North Curry CE Primary School, North Curry
North Newton Community Primary School, North Newton
North Petherton Primary School, North Petherton
North Town Academy, Taunton
Northgate Primary School, Northgate
Norton Fitzwarren Church School, Norton Fitzwarren
Norton St Philip CE First School, Norton St Philip
Norton-Sub-Hamdon CE Primary School, Norton Sub Hamdon
Nunney First School, Nunney
Oake, Bradford and Nynehead Primary School, Oake
Oakhill Church School, Oakhill
Oaklands Primary School, Yeovil
Old Cleeve CE School, Washford
Othery Village School, Othery
Otterhampton Primary School, Combwich
Our Lady of Mount Carmel RC Primary, Wincanton
Parkfield Primary School, Taunton
Pawlett Primary School, Pawlett
Pen Mill Infant and Nursery Academy, Yeovil
Preston CE Primary School, Yeovil
Priddy Primary School, Priddy
Primrose Lane Primary School, Yeovil
Priorswood Primary School, Taunton
Puriton Primary School, Puriton
Reckleford Infant School, Yeovil
The Redstart Primary School, Chard
Rockwell Green CE Primary School, Rockwell Green
Rode Methodist First School, Rode
Ruishton CE Primary School, Ruishton
St Aldhelm's CE Primary School, Doulting
St Andrew's CE Junior School, Burnham-on-Sea
St Andrew's Church School, Taunton
St Bartholomew's CE First School, Crewkerne
St Benedict's CE Junior School, Glastonbury
St Benedict's RC Primary School, Midsomer Norton
St Cuthbert's CE Academy Infants, Wells
St Cuthbert's CE Junior School, Wells
St Dubricius CE School, Porlock
St George's RC School, Taunton
St Gildas RC Primary School, Yeovil
St James Church School, Taunton
St John and St Francis Church School, Bridgwater
St John's CE First School, Frome
St John's CE Infants School, Glastonbury
St John's CE Primary School, Wellington
St Joseph and St Teresa RC Primary School, Wells
St Joseph's RC Primary School, Bridgwater
St Joseph's RC Primary School, Burnham-on-Sea
St Lawrence's CE Primary School, Westbury-sub-Mendip
St Louis RC Primary School, Frome
St Margaret's School, Tintinhull
St Mary and St Peter's Church School, Ilton
St Mary's CE Primary School, Bridgwater
St Michael's Academy, Yeovil
St Michael's CE First School, Minehead
St Nicholas CE Primary School, Henstridge
St Paul's CE Junior School, Shepton Mallet
St Peter's CE First School, Williton
St Vigor and St John Church School, Chilcompton
Sampford Arundel Community Primary School, Sampford Arundel
Shepton Beauchamp Church School, Shepton Beauchamp
Shepton Mallet Community Infants' School, Shepton Mallet
Shipham CE First School, Shipham
Somerset Bridge Primary School, Bridgwater
South Petherton CE Infants School, South Petherton
South Petherton Junior School, South Petherton
Spaxton CE Primary School, Spaxton
Staplegrove Church School, Staplegrove
Stawley Primary School, Stawley
Stoberry Park School, Wells
Stogumber CE Primary School, Stogumber
Stogursey CE Primary School, Stogursey
Stoke St Gregory CE Primary School, Stoke St Gregory
Stoke St Michael Primary School, Stoke St Michael
Tatworth Primary School, Tatworth
Thurlbear CE Primary School, Thurlbear
Timberscombe CE First School, Timberscombe
Trinity CE First School, Frome
Trull CE Primary School, Trull
Upton Noble CE Primary School, Upton Noble
Vallis First School, Frome
Walton CE Primary School, Walton
Weare Academy First School, Weare
Wedmore First School Academy, Wedmore
Wellesley Park Primary School, Wellington
Wellsprings Primary School, Taunton
Wembdon St George's Church School, Wembdon
West Buckland Primary School, West Buckland
West Chinnock CE Primary School, West Chinnock
West Coker CE Primary School, West Coker
West Huntspill Primary Academy, West Huntspill
West Monkton CE School, Monkton Heathfield
West Pennard CE Primary School, West Pennard
Westonzoyland Community Primary School, Westonzoyland
Westover Green Community School, Bridgwater
Willowdown Primary School, Bridgwater
Wincanton Primary School, Wincanton
Winsham Primary School, Winsham
Wiveliscombe Primary School, Wiveliscombe
Wookey Primary School, Wookey
Woolavington Village Primary School, Woolavington

Middle schools
Danesfield CE Middle School, Williton
Fairlands Middle School, Cheddar
Hugh Sexey CE Middle School, Blackford
Maiden Beech Academy, Crewkerne
Minehead Middle School, Minehead
Oakfield Academy, Frome
Selwood Academy, Frome

Secondary and upper schools
There are 44 state secondary schools in Somerset.

Ansford Academy, Castle Cary
Avanti Park School, Frome
Bishop Fox's School, Taunton
The Blue School, Wells
Bridgwater College Academy, Bridgwater
Brymore Academy, Cannington
Bucklers Mead Academy, Yeovil
The Castle School, Taunton
Chilton Trinity School, Chilton Trinity
Court Fields School, Wellington
Crispin School, Street
Frome Community College, Frome
Haygrove School, Bridgwater
Heathfield Community School, Monkton Heathfield
Holyrood Academy, Chard
Huish Episcopi Academy, Huish Episcopi
The King Alfred School, Highbridge
King Arthur's School, Wincanton
The Kings of Wessex Academy, Cheddar
Kingsmead School, Wiveliscombe
Preston School, Yeovil
Robert Blake Science College, Bridgwater
St Dunstan's School, Glastonbury
Sexey's School, Bruton
Stanchester Academy, Stoke-sub-Hamdon
The Taunton Academy, Taunton
Wadham School, Crewkerne
West Somerset College, Minehead
Westfield Academy, Yeovil
Whitstone School, Shepton Mallet

Special and alternative schools

Avalon School, Street
The Bridge School Sedgemoor, Cossington
Critchill Special School, Frome
Fairmead School, Yeovil
Fiveways Special School, Yeovil
The Mendip School, Prestleigh
Polden Bower School, Bridgwater
Selworthy Special School, Taunton
The Sky Academy, Taunton
South Somerset Partnership School, Yeovil
Taunton Deane Partnership College, Taunton
Tor School, Glastonbury

Further education
Bridgwater and Taunton College - Bridgwater, Taunton, Cannington
Dillington House, Whitelackington
Richard Huish College, Taunton
Strode College, Street
Yeovil College, Yeovil

Independent schools

Primary and preparatory schools

All Hallows Preparatory School, East Cranmore
Chard School, Chard
Hazlegrove Preparatory School, Sparkford
King's Hall School, Cheddon Fitzpaine
Millfield Preparatory School, Glastonbury
Perrott Hill School, North Perrott
Springmead Preparatory School, Beckington
Taunton Preparatory School, Taunton

Senior and all-through schools

Bruton School for Girls, Bruton
Downside School, Stratton-on-the-Fosse
King's College, Taunton
King's School, Bruton
Millfield, Street
Queen's College, Taunton
Taunton School, Taunton
Wellington School, Wellington
Wells Cathedral School, Wells

Special and alternative schools

3 Dimensions, Wadeford
Abbot's Way School, Meare
Cambian Somerset School, Creech St Michael
Chilton Bridge School, Chilton Cantelo
Compton Dundon School, Compton Dundon
Dovecote School, Shapwick
Inaura School, Burrowbridge
The Levels School, Ashcott 
Marchant Holliday School, North Cheriton
Newbury Manor School, Newbury
North Hill House School, Frome
The Orchard School, Lufton
Park House School, Taunton
Petherton Park School, North Petherton
Sedgemoor Manor School, Mark
Silver Bridge School, Taunton
Somerset Progressive School, West Hatch
Wessex Lodge School, Frome

Sources

 

Somerset
 Somerset
Schoo